The 2021–22 Women's EHF Champions League group stage began on 11 September 2021 and concluded on 20 February 2022 to determine the ten teams who advanced to the knockout stage of the 2021–22 Women's EHF Champions League.

Draw
The draw was held on 2 July 2020 in Vienna, Austria.

Seeding
The composition of the seeding pots for the group stage draw was announced on 30 June 2021. From each pot, two teams were drawn into Group A and the other two in Group B. Teams from the same national association were not drawn into the same group.

Format
In each group, teams played against each other in a double round-robin format, with home and away matches.

Tiebreakers
In the group stage, teams were ranked according to points (2 points for a win, 1 point for a draw, 0 points for a loss). After completion of the group stage, if two or more teams have the same number of points, the ranking is determined as follows:

Highest number of points in matches between the teams directly involved;
Superior goal difference in matches between the teams directly involved;
Highest number of goals scored in matches between the teams directly involved (or in the away match in case of a two-team tie);
Superior goal difference in all matches of the group;
Highest number of plus goals in all matches of the group;
If the ranking of one of these teams is determined, the above criteria are consecutively followed until the ranking of all teams is determined. If no ranking can be determined, a decision shall be obtained by EHF through drawing of lots.

Groups
The matchdays were 11–12 September, 18–19 September, 25–26 September, 16–17 October, 23–24 October, 30–31 October, 13–14 November, 20–21 November 2021, 8–9 January, 15–16 January, 22–23 January, 5–6 February, 12–13 February, 19–20 February 2021.

Times until 30 October 2021 are UTC+2, from 31 October 2021 on times are UTC+1.

Due to the COVID-19 pandemic, each local health department allows a different number of spectators.

Group A

Group B

Notes

References

External links
Official website

Group stage